The Chin Haw or Chin Ho, also known locally as Yunnanese, are Chinese people who migrated to Thailand via Myanmar or Laos. Most of them were originally from Yunnan, a southern province of China. They speak Southwestern Mandarin.

Migration 
Generally, the Chin Haw can be divided into three groups, according to the time of their migration.
In the nineteenth century, the Qing army sent troops to suppress the rebellion in Yunnan, known as the Panthay Rebellion, which caused up to 1,000,000 lives lost - both civilians and soldiers. During this time, many people fled to the Shan state in Burma, then to northern Thailand.
The Panthay Chinese merchants who traded between Yunnan, Burma, and Lan Na from their base in the Wa States. Some of them settled down along this trade route.
After the Chinese revolution in 1949, the 93rd Corps, which supported the Kuomintang party, fled to Burma and to northern Thailand.

Religion 

The majority are Han Chinese and follow Chinese folk religion or Buddhism. Approximately one-third are Muslim, also known as Hui people or Hui Muslim.

Activities 
The Chin Haw have traditionally been itinerant in their lifestyle, conducting long-distance caravan trade throughout the Thai-Burma-Laos frontier, southeast China, and northern Vietnam.

They have engaged in the heroin trade. Ma Hseuh-fu, from Yunnan province, was one of the most prominent Chin Haw heroin drug lords. His other professions included trading in tea and being a hotelier.

The Muslim Chin Haw are the same ethnic group as the Panthay in Burma, who are also descendants of Hui Muslims from Yunnan province, China.

See also 
Baan Haw Mosque
Attaqwa Mosque
Kokang people
Kuomintang in Burma and spillover into Thailand

References 

Ethnic groups in Thailand